Nothing Lasts Forever is the first and debut EP by Japanese rock band Coldrain. Recorded at Sound Crew Studio in Tokyo, Japan, which was self-produced by band members Masato Hayakawa and Ryo Yokochi. It was released on June 23, 2010 by VAP.

Nothing Lasts Forever was exclusively released in Japan, being released 9 months after their debut studio album Final Destination. Nothing Lasts Forever would end up entering and debuting at number 63 on the Oricon Albums Chart, while staying on the charts for the following three weeks.

The lead single "Die Tomorrow" was released just over a week before the release of Nothing Lasts Forever on 15 June, which would introduce the band to worldwide audiences for the first time after being included in the soundtrack for Pro Evolution Soccer 2011.

While not a single, "We're Not Alone" would end up being selected as the opening theme for the anime, Rainbow: Nisha Rokubō no Shichinin.

Musical style
Nothing Lasts Forever has been stylistically described by critics as post-hardcore, alternative metal, alternative rock and metalcore.

Track listing

Personnel
Credits retrieved from EP's liner notes.

Coldrain
  – lead vocals, producer
  – lead guitar, producer
  – rhythm guitar, backing vocals
  – bass guitar, backing vocals
  – drums

Additional personnel 
 Satoshi Hosoi – recording engineer, mixing
 Yoichi Imaizumi – assistant engineer
 Hiromichi Takiguchi – mastering (Parasight Mastering, Tokyo)
 Daichi Takahashi – instrument technician
 Yoshio Arimatsu – drum technician

Charts

References

External links

2010 debut EPs
Coldrain EPs
Punk rock EPs
Albums produced by Masato Hayakawa